Oid or OID may refer to:

 Oid, a 2005 album by Space Manoeuvres
 Object identifier, an object used in computing to name an object
 Oracle Internet Directory, a directory service produced by Oracle Corporation
 OpenID, a shared identity service
 Original issue discount, implicit interest on a discounted debt

See also
Ooid, sedimentary grains